Alphonse Fournier,  (March 24, 1893 – October 8, 1961) was a Canadian politician.

Born in Methuen, Massachusetts, he was first elected to the House of Commons of Canada representing the Quebec riding of Hull in the 1930 federal election. A Liberal, he was re-elected in 1935, 1940, 1945, and 1949.
 
From 1942 to 1953, he was the Minister of Public Works. From 1948 to 1953, he was the Leader of the Government in the House of Commons and Liberal Party House Leader.

His, son, Roy Fournier, was also a member of the Quebec parliament and solicitor general for the province of Quebec.

There is a Alphonse Fournier fonds at Library and Archives Canada.

References

1893 births
1961 deaths
Liberal Party of Canada MPs
Members of the House of Commons of Canada from Quebec
Members of the King's Privy Council for Canada
American emigrants to Canada
People from Methuen, Massachusetts